GE2, GE 2, G.E.2, GE-2 or variants thereof, may refer to:
 Grave Encounters 2, 2012 North American horror film
 Bristol G.E.2, British pre-World War I military aeroplane
 7343 Ockeghem or 1992 GE2, an asteroid that was the 7343rd discovered, and named "Ockeghem"
 AMC-2 (satellite) or GE-2, a communications satellite launched in 1997
 God Eater 2, a Japanese videogame released in 2013 by Namco Bandai
 Mazda MX-6 model from 1995 to 1997
 GE BWR GE-2, nuclear reactor design by General Electric
 Paraplane GE-2 Golden Eagle, an American powered parachute design